Dino Arslanagić (born 24 April 1993) is a Belgian professional footballer who plays as a centre back for Turkish Süper Lig club Göztepe. Born in Belgium, Arslanagić is of Bosnian descent.

Arslanagić started his professional career at Standard Liège, before joining Mouscron in 2017. Later that year, he moved to Antwerp. In 2020, he signed with Gent. In 2021, he joined with Göztepe.

Club career

Early career

On 19 May 2013, he scored his first professional goal against Lokeren.

In January 2017, he moved to Mouscron.

Gent
On 26 June 2020, Arslanagić joined Gent on a two-year contract.

Göztepe
On 5 July 2021, Arslanagić joined Göztepe on a two-year contract.

International career
Arslanagić represented Belgium on all youth levels.

Career statistics

Club

Honours
Standard Liège
Belgian Cup: 2015–16

References

External links
 
 

1993 births
People from Nivelles
Footballers from Walloon Brabant
Belgian people of Bosnia and Herzegovina descent
Living people
Belgian footballers
Belgium youth international footballers
Belgium under-21 international footballers
Association football central defenders
Lille OSC players
Standard Liège players
Royal Excel Mouscron players
Royal Antwerp F.C. players
K.A.A. Gent players
Göztepe S.K. footballers
Championnat National 2 players
Belgian Pro League players
Süper Lig players
Belgian expatriate footballers
Expatriate footballers in France
Belgian expatriate sportspeople in France
Expatriate footballers in Turkey
Belgian expatriate sportspeople in Turkey